The Indian locomotive class WCAG–1 is a class of dual-power AC/DC series locomotives used in the Indian Railways system. They are the only class of the WCAG  locomotives. They were specifically designed for use by Central Railways in the Ghat section towards Nashik and Pune.

History 

The WCAG-1 locomotives were developed after Central Railways faced a massive locomotive crisis in the 1990s. During this period, many of the WCM locomotives, which began to show their age, suffered several failures. As a result, CR had a tough time in maintaining train schedules, which led to the demand for a locomotive similar to the WCAM-2/2P, which was already successful in the Western Railways. Thus the WCAG-1 was introduced along with the WCAM-3, with more power and traction.

The locomotive class was jointly developed by RDSO and BHEL in 1997. Components were shared with the WCAM-3 locos (see below). Co-Co fabricated bogies (High-Adhesion—shwered with WCAM-3, WAG-7, WDG-2, etc.) with secondary suspension. Monocoque underframe. Air brakes were original equipment. They were originally manufactured under a BOLT (build-own-lease-transfer) contract with BHEL, and were probably still owned by BHEL rather than by IR. Axle-hung, nose-suspended, force ventilated, taper roller bearings Speed control by tap changers in AC mode and resistance notching in DC mode. Motors can be placed in different series-parallel combinations. Auxiliaries from Elgi, S F India, Best, Gresham & Craven, etc.

Static converter from ACEC for auxiliary supply. In DC mode, rheostatic braking by self-excitation of traction motors available until 17 km/h. Elgi compressor, other auxiliaries from S F India. Rated for 105 km/h in DC mode (AC mode rated speed was quoted at 120 km/h although it can figuratively go up to 125 km/h). But these locomotives' maximum speeds have been restricted to 100 km/h. Traction motor configurations as in the WCAM-1/2 and WAM-4 (all 6 in series, 2S 3P, or all parallel—the latter was the only one used under AC traction, enforced now by modifications to the locos).

Current usage 

The class are in active service in the Central Railway zone. CR uses WCAG-1 locos on Mumbai-Pune and Mumbai-Igatpuri sections which had ghat portions as well as speed restrictions of about 80 km/h. WCAG-1 locomotives now also serve in routes in and around Nagpur, Bhusaval. Due to exclusivity in operation/maintenance of these locomotives, they do not go beyond the Central Railway's zone limits. These dual-traction models deliver 4600 hp in DC mode and 5000 hp in AC mode, and post 25 kV transformation, WCAG-1s were fully transformed into pure AC locomotives, and the performance was even more improved.

Freight rakes double-headed by WCAG-1 (upgraded models) are a common sight on the ghat sections. MU operation possible with 3 (4?) units.

Locomotive shed

Technical specifications

See also

Locomotives of India
Rail transport in India#History
Rail transport in India
Indian Railways

References

External links 
 http://www.irfca.org/gallery/Events/cracdcjan13/
 http://www.irfca.org/faq/faq-loco-electric-dc.html#acdc

Electric locomotives of India
1500 V DC locomotives
25 kV AC locomotives
5 ft 6 in gauge locomotives
Multi-system locomotives
BHEL locomotives